Group B of the 1992 Federation Cup Asia/Oceania Zone was one of two pools in the Asia/Oceania zone of the 1992 Federation Cup. Four teams competed in a round robin competition, with the top two teams advancing to the knockout stage.

Sri Lanka vs. Chinese Taipei

Thailand vs. Hong Kong

Sri Lanka vs. Hong Kong

Chinese Taipei vs. Thailand

Sri Lanka vs. Thailand

Chinese Taipei vs. Hong Kong

See also
Fed Cup structure

References

External links
 Fed Cup website

1992 Federation Cup Asia/Oceania Zone